Laguna Hills High School (LHHS) is a public and high school located in Laguna Hills, California.

The innovative programs include the Golden-Bell Award-Winning Two-Way Language Immersion Program,

Awards and recognition
LHHS has historically had the highest API scores of the four comprehensive high schools in SVUSD, and had a score of 838 in 2007, 17 points higher than the next highest school and scored 854 in 2008, one of the top scores in the county
In Newsweek's list of the top 1,300 high schools, LHHS placed 613 which places it within the top 3% of schools nationwide
LHHS has been named a National Blue Ribbon School and a California Distinguished School on multiple occasions

Athletics

Wrestling
29 Consecutive league championships
In 2007 the program won 2 CIF titles (CIF duals and CIF individuals), 2006 CIF Champion; won the 2005 CIF Championship as well, 3 out of the last 5 years with the other two seasons recognized as CIF runners-up.

Football
6 consecutive league championships ('05-'06-'07-'08-'09-'10) to go with 7 previous titles and another title in 2012 as well as another in 2021
 Undefeated CIF Champions (2008)(13-0)
          CIF Champions(1991)(10-3-1)
            CIF Champions(1997)(13-1)
 CIF and State Champions (2022)(15-1)

Soccer
Both the boys and girls team won Pacific Coast League titles on all 3 levels. In 1990, The boys advanced and won the CIF Southern Section Finals defeating Orange High School.  The boys have also advanced to the CIF quarterfinal and the girls to the CIF semifinals in 2008.  In 2010 the boys advanced to the CIF semifinals while girls made it to the quarterfinals.  In 2015 the girls team advanced to the CIF Division 1 Finals.

Softball
Recent alums Brittany Lastrapes and Rosey Neill played in the NCAA tournament. Elisa Victa made it to Super Regionals. Brittany for the University of Arizona, Rosey for Stanford, and Elisa for North Dakota State. In 2008 the girls repeated as Pacific Coast League champions and made it to the semifinals of CIF  In 2009 a third straight title was won, and in 2010 the team won it again to make it four in a row.

References

External links
 Laguna Hills High School website
 Laguna Hills High School Instrumental Music 
 Laguna Hills High School Wrestling Program

high schools in Orange County, California
Laguna Hills, California
public high schools in California